Cho Jae-kwan (born 5 October 1977) is a South Korean para table tennis player. He won a gold medal at the 2004 Summer Paralympics, and a silver and a bronze at the 2008 Summer Paralympics.

He sustained a spinal injury in a swimming pool accident in 1993, when he was a high school student. He began playing table tennis in 1997.

References

1977 births
Living people
Table tennis players at the 2004 Summer Paralympics
Table tennis players at the 2008 Summer Paralympics
Table tennis players at the 2012 Summer Paralympics
Medalists at the 2004 Summer Paralympics
Medalists at the 2008 Summer Paralympics
South Korean male table tennis players
Paralympic bronze medalists for South Korea
Paralympic silver medalists for South Korea
Paralympic gold medalists for South Korea
Paralympic table tennis players of South Korea
Paralympic medalists in table tennis
Sportspeople from Gwangju
People with paraplegia